Zoran Miserdovski (born 5 May 1975) is a Macedonian retired footballer who played as a striker for Vardar Skopje.

Club career
Miserdovski previously played in the Greek Beta Ethniki for Kalamata.

International career
He made his senior debut for Macedonia in an October 1997 FIFA World Cup qualification match against Lithuania and has earned a total of 7 caps, scoring no goals. His final international was an October 2000 World Cup qualification match against Moldova.

References

External links
Profile at PlayerHistory

1975 births
Living people
Footballers from Skopje
Association football forwards
Macedonian footballers
North Macedonia international footballers
FK Sloga Jugomagnat players
FK Vardar players
Apollon Limassol FC players
FK Bashkimi players
Kalamata F.C. players
FK Rabotnički players
FK Milano Kumanovo players
FK Renova players
FK Gorno Lisiče players
Macedonian First Football League players
Cypriot First Division players
Football League (Greece) players
Macedonian expatriate footballers
Expatriate footballers in Cyprus
Macedonian expatriate sportspeople in Cyprus
Expatriate footballers in Greece
Macedonian expatriate sportspeople in Greece